Desrosiers is a French surname with several variants. Notable people with the surname include:

 Alain Desrosières (1940–2013), French statistician
 Arthur Desrosiers (1884–1951), Canadian doctor and politician
 Camille DesRosiers (1928–2016), Canadian Roman Catholic priest in Polynesia
 David Desrosiers, Canadian bass guitarist
 Édouard Desrosiers (born 1934), Canadian singer and politician
 Dennis Desrosiers (born 1949), Canadian ice hockey player
 Gérard Desrosiers (1919–2016), Canadian doctor and library founder
 Jacques Desrosiers (1938–1996), Canadian singer and actor
 Jake DeRosier (1880–1913), Canadian motorcycle racer
 Julien Desrosiers (born 1980), French ice hockey player
 Léo-Paul Desrosiers (1896–1967), Canadian writer and journalist
 Marie-Michèle Desrosiers (born 1950), Canadian singer
 Matt Desrosiers, American ice-hockey coach
 Nathalie Des Rosiers (born 1959), Canadian lawyer, academic, and politician
 Philippe Desrosiers (born 1995), Canadian ice hockey player
 Robert Desrosiers (born 1953), Canadian dancer, choreographer and actor
 Sylvie Desrosiers (born 1954), Canadian writer

French-language surnames